Gold and Green is the third album by the Japanese band OOIOO, a side-project of Boredoms member Yoshimi P-We.

Track listing

Personnel

OOIOO
 Yoshimi P-We - vocals, guitars, trumpet, flute, keyboards, synths, wind chimes, drums, percussion
 Maki - bass
 Yoshico - drums, maracas, programming
 Kayano - guitar, vocals

Guests
Green and Gold contains many guest artists, most notably Sean Lennon and Yuka Honda.
 Kyoko - vocals (tracks 4, 6, 11)
 Yoshida Atuhisa - bass, santoor (track 4)
 Seiichi Yamamoto - production (track 4)
 Sean Lennon - backing vocals (track 4)
 Yuka Honda - piano (track 4)
 Yuzawa Hironori - tabla (track 4), kanjira (track 11)
 L?K?O - turntables (tracks 7, 12)
 Atari - congas (track 11)

Production

 Hara Kouichi - Engineer, Mixing
 Wayama Hiroko - Executive Producer
 Koizumi Yuka - Mastering
 Yoshimi P-We - Mixing, Producer

Artwork

 Cover Work - Miyano Tayuka (& Grafika) & Yoshimi P-We 
 Guidebook Drawing - Fukuta Seigo 
 Photography - Yoshimi P-We

Releases information

References

2000 albums
OOIOO albums
Thrill Jockey albums